This list of most expensive watches sold at auction documents the watches sold at auction worldwide for at least 9.5 million US dollars. The final price listed is the total price paid by the buyer converted to US dollars, according to the currency exchange rate at the time of auction. This price is the aggregate of the hammer price (i.e., the winning bid or sale price at the auction) plus any buyer's premium paid to the auction houses (where levied, and in accordance with the rates charged by the relevant auction house). While the rates of buyer's vary between auction houses (which rates can also vary within each auction house based on the nature of the lot and its value), most auction houses publish their results inclusive of the buyer's premium, and so the rankings which follow are based on the aggregated price paid by the buyer: for the watch itself (the hammer or sale price) and for the auction house's services and administrative costs (the buyer's premium). Inflation-adjusted prices are also listed for reference. If a watch has been sold at auction for several times, only the highest final price is included. Finally, any auctioned watch without public online records from auctioneers (e.g. major auction houses) will not be included in the ranking.

As of December 2021, the most expensive watch (and wristwatch) ever sold at auction is the Patek Philippe Grandmaster Chime Ref. 6300A-010, fetching US$31.19 million (31,000,000 CHF) in Geneva on 9 November 2019. The most expensive pocket watch ever sold at auction is the Patek Philippe Henry Graves Supercomplication, fetching US$23.98 million (23,237,000 CHF) in Geneva on 11 November 2014.

As of December 2021, at least 101 watches have been sold at auction for over two million US dollars, and at least 160 watches have been sold at auction for over 1.5 million US dollars. Among the top 10 of these watches, eight are Patek Philippe watches and two are Rolex watches.

Summary (as of December 2021)

Auction records 
Worldwide: The most expensive watch ever sold at auction worldwide is the Patek Philippe Grandmaster Chime Ref. 6300A-010, which fetched 31.19 million US dollars (31,000,000 CHF) in Geneva on 9 November 2019 (by Christie's).
Asia: The most expensive watch ever sold at auction in Asia is the Patek Philipe Gobbi Milan Double Signed "Heures Universelles" Ref. 2523, which fetched 8.967 million US dollars (70,175,000 HKD) in Hong Kong on 23 November 2019 (by Christie's).
Europe: The most expensive watch ever sold at auction in Europe is the Patek Philippe Grandmaster Chime Ref. 6300A-010, which fetched 31.19 million US dollars (31,000,000 CHF) in Geneva on 9 November 2019 (by Christie's).
North America: The most expensive watch ever sold at auction in North America is the Paul Newman's Rolex Daytona, which fetched 17.75 million US dollars in New York on 26 October 2017 (by Phillips).

Auction houses 
The following table shows the breakdown of auction houses that have sold the most expensive watches at auctions (for at least 2 million US dollars). As of December 2021, there are at least six auction houses that have sold watches for no less than two million US dollars: Christie's, Phillips, Antiquorum, Sotheby's, Audemars Piguet and Poly Auction.

The following table has a threshold of 1.5 million US dollars.

Manufacturers 
The following table shows the brand breakdown of the most expensive watches ever sold at auction (for at least 2 million US dollars). As of December 2021, there are fourteen manufacturers that have manufactured watches sold at auction for at least two million US dollars: Patek Philippe, Rolex, Breguet, Audemars Piguet, Philippe Dufour, F. P. Journe, George Daniels, Richard Mille, URWERK, Zenith, Vacheron Constantin, Omega, Tag Heuer, Jehan Cremsdorff (Paris) and Attributed to Piguet & Capt. Philippe Dufour, F.P. Journe, George Daniels, Richard Mille, URWERK, Jehan Cremsdorff and Attributed to Piguet & Capt are independent watchmakers. 

The following table has a threshold of 1.5 million US dollars. Two additional manufacturers join: Chopard and Bulova

Ranked list (as of December 2021)

Top 101 
The following table contains details of the 101 watches auctioned for at least two million US dollars, ranked according to their original auction prices.

102–160th 
The following table contains details of the watches auctioned for close to (but did not reach) two million US dollars, ranked according to their original auction prices. The threshold is 1.5 million US dollars.

Temporary list (January – December 2022) 
The following table contains details of the latest auction results from January to December 2022. The information is updated to the main list at the end of the year.

Unranked results 
The following table contains some of the most expensive auctioned watches without public online records from auctioneers (e.g., major auction houses). This list is possibly incomplete.

See also 

 List of watch manufacturers
 Patek Philippe Henry Graves Supercomplication
 Patek Philippe Calibre 89
 Rolex Daytona

Notes

References 

Watches, Auction
Auction-related lists
Watches